Miss Venezuela 1993 was the 40th Miss Venezuela pageant, was held in Caracas, Venezuela on September 3, 1993, after weeks of events. The winner of the pageant was Minorka Mercado, Miss Apure.

The pageant was broadcast live on Venevisión from the Teresa Carreño Cultural Complex in Caracas. At the conclusion of the final night of competition, outgoing titleholder Milka Chulina, crowned Minorka Mercado of Apure as the new Miss Venezuela.

Results
Miss Venezuela 1993 - Minorka Mercado (Miss Apure)
Miss World Venezuela 1993 - Mónica Lei (Miss Distrito Federal)
Miss Venezuela International 1993 - Faviola Spitale (Miss Yaracuy)

The runners-up were:
1st runner-up - Kalena Díaz (Miss Portuguesa)
2nd runner-up - Gabriela Hidalgo (Miss Miranda)
3rd runner-up - Mónica Montenegro (Miss Aragua)
4th runner-up - Fabiola Celadón (Miss Trujillo)
5th runner-up - Mercedes Wanderlinder (Miss Bolívar)

Special awards
 Miss Photogenic (voted by press reporters) - Gabriela Hidalgo (Miss Miranda)
 Miss Congeniality - Kalena Díaz (Miss Portuguesa)
 Miss Elegance - Gabriela Hidalgo (Miss Miranda)
 Most Beautiful Eyes - Jessuly González (Miss Carabobo)
 Best Smile - Tamara Aguilar (Miss Monagas)

Delegates
The Miss Venezuela 1993 delegates are:

 Miss Amazonas - Patricia María Angulo D'Ascoli
 Miss Anzoátegui - Marianne Suárez Morales
 Miss Apure - Minorka Marisela Mercado Carrero
 Miss Aragua - Mónica Montenegro Prósperi
 Miss Barinas - Emma Ysabel  Villafañe Monsalve
 Miss Bolívar - Mercedes Caridad Wanderlinder Perrone
 Miss Carabobo - Jessuly del Valle González Gutiérrez
 Miss Cojedes - Sophie Aznar Desouches
 Miss Costa Oriental - Lilibeth Nefer Silva Méndez
 Miss Delta Amacuro - Vanessa Isabel Lamela Brito
 Miss Dependencias Federales - Marlyare Iselle Yanes Cañas
 Miss Distrito Federal - Mónica Lei Scaccia
 Miss Falcón - Ana Rosalinda Vera Garmendia
 Miss Guárico - Elidex Coromoto Riera Díaz
 Miss Lara - Igoa Azpúrua Larrañaga
 Miss Mérida - Madelaine de las Mercedes Banchs Ramos
 Miss Miranda  - Gabriela Hidalgo Arreaza
 Miss Monagas - Tamara Vanessa Aguilar Lazcano
 Miss Nueva Esparta - Sonia Vera Aparicio
 Miss Península Goajira - Limairy Josefina Velásquez Semprún
 Miss Portuguesa - Carmen Elena "Kalena" Díaz Molina
 Miss Sucre - Heliette Sturhan Ochoa
 Miss Táchira - Daniela Johanna Pérez Velasco
 Miss Trujillo - Fabiola Josefina Celadón Faoro†
 Miss Yaracuy - Rina Faviola Mónica Spitale Baiamonte
 Miss Zulia - Fabiola de los Angeles Martínez Benavides

Contestants notes
Fabiola Celadón (Trujillo) died in a plane crash on March 1, 2009.

External links
Miss Venezuela official website

1993 beauty pageants
1993 in Venezuela